Tignor is an unincorporated community in Caroline County, in the U.S. state of Virginia. The main highway leading into it is State Route 630.  Tignor, VA is at the intersection of Sparta Road and Tignor Road.

References

Unincorporated communities in Virginia
Unincorporated communities in Caroline County, Virginia